Cymbachus is a genus of beetles in the sub-family Lycoperdininae.

External links 

 Cymbachus at biolib.cz

Endomychidae
Coccinelloidea genera